Albert, Margrave of Meissen may refer to:
Albert I, Margrave of Meissen (1158–1195)
Albert II, Margrave of Meissen (1240–1314)
Albert III, Margrave of Meissen (1255–1308)
Albert IV, Margrave of Meissen (1443–1500)
Albert, Margrave of Meissen (1934–2012)

See also
Albert of Saxony (disambiguation)